The Holy War  is a rivalry in Polish football between Wisła Kraków and KS Cracovia, the two biggest clubs in Kraków and reportedly the oldest in Poland, both founded in 1906. The term Holy War was coined by the defender from KS Cracovia, Ludwik Gintel. It is also the theme of a song devoted to their never-ending shenanigans, played by Andrusy.

Highlights
The earliest extant records of the Holy War originate from the newspaper published on 20 September 1908 informing that the match played at Błonia Park between the two teams resulted in a 1:1 draw.  Earlier matches were also reported, but their results are missing from archives of the local media. The first competition in accordance with the 1904 official FIFA standards, took place on 8 May 1913 at the Cracovia stadium in Kraków, with the home team winning over Wisła 2:1.

The Holy War is considered the most intense rivalry in Poland and one of the most intense in all of Europe. Despite the fact that the two stadiums are less than a kilometer away, the fans are two bitter rivals against each other, often resulting in fights between them as well as the police.

Clubs 
Cracovia and Wisła Kraków are two of the oldest still existing football clubs in Poland.

All-time results

 1982 Puchar Polski match ended 2 - 2, Wisła won 5 - 3 on penalties.

Notes and references

External links
  Wisla.Krakow.pl
  Cracovia.pl
 FootballDerbies.com

Sport in Kraków
Wisła Kraków
MKS Cracovia
Football rivalries in Poland
1908 establishments in Poland